Industrial terrorism is terrorism whose sole purpose is to strike at the heart of the business and critical infrastructure of a nation. It aims to create the greatest amount of economic damage possible, thus causing a strong impact on national and public opinion internationally. Such activity raises the need to create industry standards to provide some protection against terrorist attacks.

When more infrastructure and companies are protected by antiterrorism standards, it becomes more expensive, and more time is necessary, to plan an attack on that entity. In this way, intelligence agencies and companies can put off an attack and buy time to identify the involved terrorist groups. Following the Madrid and London terror attacks, certain companies and service providers in Europe are now required by law to formulate industrial antiterrorism protocols.

Subjects
The main areas subject to the adoption of anti-terrorism standards are:

 Nuclear
 Aviation
 Chemical
 Petrochemical
 Pharmaceutical
 Energy
 Transport
 First Aid
 Telecommunications
 Water
 Food

References

External links
Industrial Antiterrorism

Counterterrorism